The Port of Camden is situated on east bank of the Delaware River in Camden and Gloucester City in southern New Jersey. It is one of several ports in the Delaware Valley metro area port complex and is located near the mouth of Newtown Creek opposite the Port of Philadelphia. The port is one of the nation's largest for wood products, steel, cocoa and perishable fruit.

Shipping channel, air draft, port of entry

Local pilotage is generally required for larger commercial vessels.

The air draft of the port is 150 feet, restricted by the Walt Whitman Bridge. Downstream of the bridge air draft is 188 feet, restricted by Delaware Memorial Bridge

It is a port of entry in United States Citizenship and Immigration Services (USCIS) District 21, which covers New Jersey.

The Delaware River port complex refers to the ports and energy facilities along the river in the tri-state PA-NJ-DE Delaware Valley region. They include the Port of Salem, the Port of Wilmington, the Port of Chester, the Port of Paulsboro, the Port of Philadelphia and the Port of Camden. Combined they create one of the largest shipping areas of the United States.  In 2016, 2,427 ships arrived at Delaware River port facilities: Fruit ships were counted at 577, petroleum at 474, and containerized cargo at 431.

Historical shipbuilding and ferries
New York Shipbuilding and Dialogue & Company were both located in the port.
Much of the current port operations are located on what were once shipyards. Dialogue & Company was further upstream. John H. Mathis & Company was a shipbuilding company founded around 1900, based at Cooper Point. Penn-Jersey Shipbuilding Corp. was also located at Cooper Point.

The United States lightship Barnegat (LV-79), built in the city, is located in Cooper Point, and is considered threatened.

Ferry service between Camden and Philadelphia existed for 264 years. The first commercial crossing of the Delaware was first established in 1688; the last ferry to depart the city was in 1952. The seasonal RiverLink Ferry was established in 1999.

Operations and facilities

The semi-public South Jersey Port Corporation (SJPC) oversees a number of facilities, for which the Delaware River Stevedores handle much of the traffic.
Additionally there are other privately run facilities in the port, including those of Holt Logistics, Joseph Oat Corporation, Holtech International, Mafco, EMR subsidiary Camden Iron and Steel and Camden Yards Steel. The Camden County MUA maintains a large treatment plant on the waterfront.

SJPC
Marine terminals operated by South Jersey Port Corporation (SJPC), which also oversees the Port of Paulsboro and the Port of Salem:

Balzano Terminal (formerly the Beckett Street Terminal) is a  bulk and break bulk cargo complex that handles wood products, steel products, cocoa beans, containers, iron ore, furnace slag, scrap metal and containerized cargo
Broadway Terminal is a  complex that handles petroleum coke, furnace slag, dolomite, other dry bulk items, steel products, wood products, minerals, cocoa beans, fresh fruit as well as containerized cargo.

Holt Logistics and Holtec

Holt Logistics operates terminals in the port
Pier 5 Broadway Produce Terminal 28 Acres (11.3 ha) with a three reefer-building complex that handles bananas, pineapples, and other perishables
Gloucester Marine Terminal is a  site which features the largest refrigerated capacity of any terminal in the United States and the largest rooftop photovoltaic installations in the USA It has four deep water berths and 12 dry/heated warehouses with more than 1,000,000 square feet of space and 13 reefer/frozen warehouses with 15 million cubic feet of space. Del Monte has been a presence in the port since 1989 and since 2010 a Gloucester.
Holtec International operates it corporate offices from new facilities from a 600,000-square-foot facility at the Broadway Terminal. In July 2014, the New Jersey Economic Development Authority awarded the company a $260 million tax incentive to expand operations.

Weeks Marine
Weeks Marine, a maritime salvage, construction, and transportation company, maintains facilities upstream of the Benjamin Franklin Bridge at Pyne Point

Road

Delaware River Port Authority operates bridges in the port.
The Walt Whitman Bridge crosses the Delaware River at the port as Interstate 76 (I-76), which interchanges with Interstate 295. The Benjamin Franklin Bridge (U.S. Route 30 is the north side of Camden.

The North-South Freeway, which carries Interstate 676 north to downtown Camden.  Route 76C connector runs east to U.S. Route 130 and Route 168.

County Routes 537, 543, 551 and 561 all travel through the center of the city.

Rail
Rail service to some parts of the port is within Conrail's South Jersey/Philadelphia Shared Assets Area. The port is located south of Pavonia Yard and the Delair Bridge, the most downstream railroad bridge crossing the Delaware at Pennsuaken. The Vineland Secondary has a spur running along the port. Norfolk Southern Railway and CSX Transportation are accessible through Conrail switching operations.

Tourism and recreation

The Central Waterfront, with Wiggins Marina, lies upstream of the maritime and industrial facilities in the port. The USS New Jersey (BB-62) is berthed between the two districts. The BB&T Pavilion, Wiggins Park, and the Adventure Aquarium are located nearby.

Bergen Square and Waterfront South are two districts located to the east of the port. There has been some conflict with combining residential needs with port needs. The Camden Shipyard & Maritime Museum opened in 2016. Phoenix Park was developed in 2015 allowing for waterfront access for recreation in the midst of the maritime facilities.

The Freedom Pier is a public waterfront promenade at the former Coast Guard Base Gloucester.

See also

Petty Island
List of ports in the United States
United States container ports
Pureland Industrial Complex is located 12 miles south of the port
Port of Wilmington (Delaware), a component of the Delaware Valley port system
Port of Chester, a component of the Delaware Valley port system
Ships built in Camden, New Jersey

References

External links 

Southern New Jersey's International Seaports
South Jersey Freight Transportation and Economic Development Assessment 2010
Master Plan South Jersey Waterfront Delaware River Port Authority Southern New Jersey Waterfront Master January 11, 2006

Port of Camden
Delaware River
Camden
Camden
South Jersey Port Corporation
Container terminals
Camden, New Jersey
Gloucester City, New Jersey